Tsovkra-2 is a rural locality (a selo) in Kulinsky District, Republic of Dagestan, Russia. The population was 420 as of 2010. There are 8 streets.

Geography 
Tsovkra-2 is located 20 km southwest of Vachi (the district's administrative centre) by road, on the left bank of the Kunnikh River. Tshushchar and Vachi are the nearest rural localities.

Nationalities 
Laks live there.

References 

Rural localities in Kulinsky District